Golf de Chantilly is a 36-hole golf complex situated 45 km north of Paris in the town of Vineuil-Saint-Firmin, department of Oise, France.

History 
The club, opened in 1909, sits just over a kilometer from the Château de Chantilly in the middle of a green forest, Forêt De Chantilly. It features two 18-hole courses, the Vineuil course and the Longères course. Tom Simpson extended the original 9-hole Vineuil course to 18 in 1920 when he also built a second course, the Longères. It suffered badly in WWII and was abandoned after the war, until Donald Steel used 5 of the old holes combined with 13 new ones he designed to re-open it in the 1980s.

Tournaments 
Chantilly has hosted a wide array of national and international championships since it opened in 1909. 

It has hosted the Open de France, the oldest national open in continental Europe, eleven times between 1913 and 1990.

Professional

Amateur 
Vagliano Trophy – 19341953196920052013
French International Ladies Amateur Championship – 1963
EGA Trophy – 1976
European Amateur Team Championship – 19832016
European Boys' Team Championship – 19872019
St Andrews Trophy – 1994
European Mid-Amateur Men's Championship – 1996
Jacques Léglise Trophy – 2001
European Senior Ladies' Championship – 2005
European Senior Men's Championship – 2005
European Young Masters – 2008
European Amateur – 2009
Junior Vagliano Trophy – 2013

References

External links

Golf clubs and courses in France
Sports venues in Oise
1909 establishments in France
Sports venues completed in 1909